Friedrich Robert Faehlmann (Fählmann) (31 December 1798 in Ao Manor, Kreis Jerwen – 22 April 1850 in Tartu) was an Estonian writer, medical doctor and philologist active in Livonia, Russian Empire. He was a co-founder of the Learned Estonian Society at the University of Dorpat and its chairman (1843-1850).

He was born to the family of the manager of Ao Manor (now in Väike-Maarja Parish) in Kreis Jerwen. In 1825 he graduated from the medical department of the University of Dorpat. In 1827 he earned the M.D. degree and become a physician in Dorpat (now Tartu). In addition he gave lectures in the Estonian language at the university during 1842–1850.

In the 1820s he became interested in Estonian culture and, in 1838, became a co-founder of the Learned Estonian Society.

He brought attention to Estonian folklore, notably the Kalevipoeg which, since his death, has become the Estonian national epic, thanks to the efforts of another Estophile, Friedrich Reinhold Kreutzwald. He also recorded a number of tales.

In 1840 his story "Koit ja Hämarik" (Dawn and Dusk) was first published.

He died of tuberculosis in Dorpat.

Publications 
 M.D. dissertation "Observationes inflammationum occultiorum" (1827)
 "Versuch einer neuen Anordnung der Conjunctionen in der estnischen Sprache" (1842)
 "Ueber die Declination der estnischen Nomina" (1844)
 "Die Ruhrepidemie in Dorpat im Herbst 1846" (1846)
 "Verhandlungen der Gelehrten estnischen Gesellschaft" (1852)

In memoriam 
In 1930 a bronze bust (sculptor V. Mellik) was installed in Tartu.

In 1998 the Estonian Post issued a postmark in the commemoration of the 200th anniversary of his birth.

References and notes

External links
 Friedrich Robert Faehlmann at Estonian Writers' Online Dictionary

1798 births
1850 deaths
People from Väike-Maarja Parish
People from Kreis Jerwen
Estonian physicians
Physicians from the Russian Empire
Estonian non-fiction writers
Estophiles
University of Tartu alumni
Academic staff of the University of Tartu
19th-century deaths from tuberculosis
Tuberculosis deaths in Estonia
Burials at Raadi cemetery